The BMW Group Plant Dingolfing is a network of BMW plants in Dingolfing, Dingolfing-Landau, Lower Bavaria, Germany with a total area of around 280 hectares.

The plant is the largest production site of the BMW Group in Europe.

History
The origins of the BMW Group's Dingolfing plant go back to the former Hans Glas GmbH, which had been based in Dingolfing since 1905. In 1967 BMW took over Hans Glas GmbH, in 1968 the production of chassis parts and motorcycle parts for BMWs began, production of the Goggomobil continued until 1969. On November 9, 1970, the foundation stone was laid for vehicle plant 02.40; on September 27, 1973, the first BMW 5 Series left the production line. Since then, more than ten million BMW vehicles have been produced at the Dingolfing plant.

The factory produces up to 1,600 BMW automobiles a day, as well as bodyshells for all Rolls-Royce models. In addition, chassis and drive components as well as pressed parts are manufactured on site.

In 2017, a record production of 376,580 vehicles was achieved (2016: 339,769 vehicles).

In May 2022, The plant increased production of fifth-generation electric motor, high voltage batteries and battery modules for use in BMW iX and BMW i4.

Plants
The BMW Group Plant Dingolfing was created by the takeover of Hans Glas GmbH in 1967. The former Glas plant became plant 02.10.

Commuter bus traffic
A special feature of this plant is the commuter bus service, which brings employees from large parts of Lower Bavaria, parts of the Upper Palatinate and Upper Bavaria to Dingolfing. This was introduced to reduce the traffic load on the small town of Dingolfing with its 18,000 inhabitants. 320 buses bring 13,000 employees to Dingolfing. They cover 43,000 kilometers per day.

Product range
At the BMW Group Dingolfing plant, more than ten models from five series are currently being made. With the BMW 530e and the BMW 740e, two models with plug-in hybrid drive, as well as the new BMW 8 Series are manufactured at the Dingolfing plant.

 BMW 4 Series
 BMW M4
 BMW 5 Series (Sedan / Touring)
 BMW M5
 BMW 6 Series (Gran Turismo)
 BMW 7 Series
 BMW 8 Series (Coupé / Cabrio)
 BMW iX Series

References

BMW
Motor vehicle assembly plants in Germany
Dingolfing-Landau